Purdey is a family name and may refer to:

 Purdey (The New Avengers), fictional character played by Joanna Lumley in the British TV series
 James Purdey and Sons, British gunmaker
 Mark Purdey (1953-2006), British organic farmer and anti-pesticide advocate
 Purdey's, soft drink produced by Orchid Drinks Ltd

See also
 Purdie
Purdy (disambiguation)